Arad was an Ancient city and bishopric and is now a Catholic titular see.

History 
The Ancient city was in the Roman province of Palestina III. It was a diocese, suffragan of the Metropolitan of Petra.

Its remains are at Tell-'Arad in modern Jordan.

Titular see 
The diocese was nominally restored as a titular see of the lowest (episcopal) rank in 1725.
 
It is vacant since 1969 after having had the following, often non-consecutive incumbents:
 Karol Poniński (1725.12.19 – 1727.09)
 Caspar Adolph Schnernauer (1728.05.10 – 1733.06.20)
 Franz Joseph Anton von Hahn (1734.03.27 – 1748.07.04)
 Andrés Cano y Junquera (1748.12.16 – 1770.09.10)
 Friar Ignacy Houwalt (1804.08.20 – 1807.05.05)
 Giovanni Domenico Rizzolati, Franciscans (O.F.M.) (1839.08.30 – 1862.04.13)
 Pedro José Tordoya Montoya (1880.08.20 – 1881)
 Augustine Kandathil (1911.08.29 – 1923.12.21) (later Archbishop)
 Pierre Aziz Ho (1924.01.16 – 1929.08.03)
 Jacob Abraham Theophilos Kalapurakal (1932.02.13 – 1932.06.11)
 Pierre-Marie Gourtay, Spiritans (C.S.Sp.) (1933.01.10 – 1944.09.16)
 Vicente Roig y Villalba, Capuchins (O.F.M. Cap.) (1944.12.15 – 1969.04.25)

See also 
 Catholic Church in Jordan

References

External links 
 GigaCatholic, with titular bishop biographies

Former Roman Catholic dioceses in Africa
Catholic titular sees in Asia